Borotín is the name of several locations in the Czech Republic:

Borotín (Blansko District), a municipality and village in the South Moravian Region
Borotín (Tábor District), a market town in the South Bohemian Region